Semen Smunev (born 14 September 1995) is a Belarusian footballer who plays for Veles-2020 Vitebsk.

References

External links
 
 
 Profile at Neman Grodno website

1995 births
Living people
People from Murmansk
Belarusian footballers
Association football defenders
FC Vitebsk players
FC Naftan Novopolotsk players
FC Smorgon players
FC Neman Grodno players
FC Orsha players
FC Sputnik Rechitsa players